Farrell (also O'Farrell, Farrall) is a surname of Irish origin. It is the anglicized form of the Gaelic patronym Ó Fearghail. The Farrells were hereditary Chiefs and Princes of Annaly (modern-day County Longford).

People surnamed Farrell

In music and ballet
Angela Farrell, Irish singer
Bernadette Farrell, English composer
Ciarán Farrell, Irish composer
Bobby Farrell (1949–2010), Dutch DJ
Daoirí Farrell, Irish singer
Dave Farrell, American musician
Eibhlis Farrell, Irish composer
Eileen Farrell, American soprano
Gail Farrell, American singer
Joe Farrell, American saxophonist
Niamh Farrell, Irish singer
Perry Farrell, American musician
Richard Ray Farrell (born 1956), American blues musician and songwriter
Suzanne Farrell, American ballerina

In sports and games

American football
Dillon Farrell, American footballer
Luke Farrell (American football) (born 1997), American football player
Neil Farrell Jr. (born 1998), American football player

Baseball
Frank J. Farrell, Yankees owner
Joe Farrell (baseball) (1857–1893), American baseball player
Kerby Farrell (1913–1975), American baseball player and manager
Luke Farrell (baseball) (born 1991), American baseball player
Turk Farrell (1934–1977), American baseball player

Football (soccer)
Andrew Farrell (soccer) (born 1992), American footballer
Andy Farrell (footballer) (born 1965), English footballer
Craig Farrell (footballer) (1982–2022), English footballer
Damien Farrell, Antiguan footballer
Dessie Farrell, Irish footballer
Greg Farrell, Scottish footballer
Joe Farrell (soccer) (born 1994), American soccer player
Kyron Farrell, English footballer

Rugby
Andy Farrell (born 1975), English former league then union player, now a manager 
Frank Farrell (rugby league), Australian, played for Newtown, NSW and Australia 
Hec Farrell, Australian rugby league player, played for Western Suburbs 
Owen Farrell, English rugby union player, plays for Saracens and England

Other sports and games
John Farrell (speed skating), American skater
Johnny Farrell, American golfer
Mary Jane Farell, American bridge player
Renita Farrell, Australian field hockey player
Dan Farrell, Canadian ice hockey player

In literature
Brian Farrell (broadcaster), Irish broadcaster
Henry Farrell, American author
J. G. Farrell (1935–1979), Irish author
James T. Farrell, American author
John Farrell (poet), American poet
John Farrell (Australian poet), Australian poet
Kathleen Farrell, British author
Warren Farrell, American author

In television and film
Mark Farrell, Canadian comedian
Charles Farrell (1901–1990), American actor
Colin Farrell, Irish actor
Glenda Farrell, American actress
Graham Farrell (born 1967), British criminologist
Judy Farrell, American actress
Mike Farrell, American actor
Nicholas Farrell, British actor
Paul Farrell (1893–1975), Irish actor
Stephen Farrell (journalist), journalist
Terry Farrell (actress), American actress
Timothy Farrell, American actor
Tommy Farrell, American actor

In the military
John Farrell (VC), Irish soldier
Lisagh Farrell, English soldier
Thomas Farrell (general), American general
Sir William Farrell-Skeffington, 1st Baronet, English soldier

In politics
Craig Farrell (politician), Australian politician
Daniel F. Farrell (c. 1869 – 1939), New York politician
Druh Farrell (born 1958 or 1959), Canadian municipal politician
Edelmiro Julián Farrell, President of Argentina
Henry Farrell (political scientist), American professor
Herman D. Farrell Jr. (1932–2018), New York politician
Peggy Farrell (politician) (1920–2003), Irish politician
Robert C. Farrell, American politician
Terry Farrell (politician), Canadian politician
Willie Farrell (1928–2010), Irish politician

In other fields
Brian D. Farrell, American curator
Brian Farrell (bishop), American bishop
Kathleen Farrell (judge), Australian judge
Kevin Joseph Farrell (born 1947), American cardinal
Leone N. Farrell (1904–1986), Canadian biologist
Mairéad Farrell (1957–1988), IRA soldier
Michael James Farrell (1926–1975), English economist
Red Rocks Farrell, American criminal
Tami Farrell, American actress
Sir Terry Farrell, English architect
Sir Thomas Farrell, Irish sculptor
William Farrell (architect) (died 1851), Irish architect
Yvonne Farrell, Irish architect

Fictional characters
Caroline Farrell ("Echo"), protagonist of Dollhouse (TV series)
Jamey Farrell, character in 24 (TV series)
Kat Farrell, character in the Marvel Universe
Rosa Farrell, character in Final Fantasy IV
Erica and Heather Farrell, twins from Degrassi
Shawn Farrell, character in The 4400
Matt Farrell, character in Live Free or Die Hard
Captain Farrell, character in Thin Lizzy song 'Whiskey in the Jar'
Patty Farrell, character from the Diary of A Wimpy Kid franchise

See also
Ó Fearghail
O'Farrell

English-language surnames
Irish families
Surnames of Irish origin
Anglicised Irish-language surnames